Amauris tartarea, the monk or dusky friar, is a butterfly in the family Nymphalidae. It is found in Guinea, Burkina Faso, Sierra Leone, Liberia, Ivory Coast, Ghana, Togo, Benin, Nigeria, Cameroon, Equatorial Guinea, Gabon, the Republic of the Congo, the Central African Republic, Angola, the Democratic Republic of the Congo, Sudan, Uganda, Kenya, Tanzania, Malawi, Zambia, Botswana and Namibia. The habitat consists of various types of forests.

Adult males mud-puddle and imbibe pyrrolizidine alkaloids from Heliotropium species, especially from the roots of dug-up plants. Both sexes are attracted to flowers. The species is mimicked by Hypolimnas anthedon.

The larvae feed on Asclepiadaceae and Brassica species.

Subspecies
Amauris tartarea tartarea (Guinea, Burkina Faso, Sierra Leone, Liberia, Ivory Coast, Ghana, Togo, Benin, Nigeria, Cameroon, Equatorial Guinea: Mbini, Gabon, Congo, Central African Republic, Angola, Democratic Republic of the Congo, southern Sudan, Uganda, western Kenya, western Tanzania, Zambia, north-eastern Botswana, Namibia)
Amauris tartarea damoclides Staudinger, 1896 (south-eastern Kenya, eastern and northern Tanzania, Malawi, north-eastern Zambia)
Amauris tartarea tukuyuensis Kielland, 1990 (south-western Tanzania)

References

Further reading

Seitz, A. Die Gross-Schmetterlinge der Erde 13: Die Afrikanischen Tagfalter. Plate XIII 25 also  as  bulbifera and psyttalea and (spp.) damoclides

Butterflies described in 1876
Amauris
Butterflies of Africa
Taxa named by Paul Mabille